Lophogyne is a genus of flowering plants belonging to the family Podostemaceae.

Its native range is Northern South America to Brazil.

Species:

Lophogyne aripuanensis 
Lophogyne ceratophylla 
Lophogyne divertens 
Lophogyne fimbriata 
Lophogyne fimbrifolia 
Lophogyne goeldiana 
Lophogyne isoetifolia 
Lophogyne lacunosa 
Lophogyne paraensis 
Lophogyne royenella 
Lophogyne tridactylitifolia 
Lophogyne varians

References

Podostemaceae
Malpighiales genera